Stevan Kragujević (Serbian Cyrillic: Стеван Крагујевић; 4 February 1922 – 17 April 2002) was a Serbian photojournalist and art photographer.

Trade and professional work 
He became occupied with photography at the age of fourteen. He learned the photographer's trade in Senta with Martin Ronai and Danilo Jakšić. During the war, Stevan went on with his education and progress. Keeping friends with the experienced Geza Barta in Novi Sad, he bought at his photo shop one of the first colour films and used it only for the most valuable shots. So, in 1943, "A Goose-girl", the photo of a young woman with a basket and geese in a Vojvodina alley, was taken. The photo, entitled "A Motif from Vojvodina Village" was published on the front cover of "Duga" magazine, No.313, which, in that way, in 1950, became the first illustrated magazine with the front cover in colour.

He was the first photojournalist of the Information Agency at the Presidium of SFRY, which was managed by Eva Biro, international public-relations person, and headed by Vladimir Dedijer.

Among other photos, the first official portrait of President Tito, made by Kragujević in 1950, was intended for foreign embassies and correspondents. The photo is preserved in Kragujević's archives. Later in his career, Stevan made a rich stock of photos of President Tito, covering his trips around the country, visits to various companies, meetings with foreign statesmen, workmen, artists, citizens, or young people, but, apart from official photos, he took a series of anthological, unofficial ones. Because of that, many people considered him Tito's personal photographer – which he was not.

After that period (1949–1951), Stevan Kragujević became a member of the selected team of photographers in Tanjug (1951–1953), and from 1953 until retirement in 1982 a photojournalist and photo editor of the daily newspaper "Politika".

During his work in "Politika", especially in the period of modernization (after moving to the new, present-day building) he held other important positions – Chief of the Photolaboratory and Photo department of the company. For a long time he was the head of the Photo department, passed on his experience on his younger colleagues, organized very active day and nighttime-work of the photo editorial office, and especially improved the sense of responsibility and awareness of the importance of taking care of the films and the establishment of rich photographic archives. Until his retirement, he was also a photo editor and helped in introducing a new section in "Politika", especially the one stressing the real value and importance of photography ("U slici i reči" – " Through picture and Word")

Photographic documentation 
With his ample work, Kragujević made a unique documentary chronology about the development of Yugoslavia, being an eyewitness, as a photojournalist, of all important political, cultural, artistic and sports events. As an accredited correspondent, he was present at all the events in the Yugoslav Assembly, Party and Union conventions, May-Day Parade and Youth Day, formation of the Non-Aligned Movement (NAM, Brioni, 1956), about student protests in 1968, natural disasters and accidents (Skoplje earthquake, 1963).

The gallery of his excellent portraits of politicians, statesmen and monarchs in the second half of the twentieth century, who visited Yugoslavia at that time (Nehru, Nasser, Indira Gandhi, Khrushchev, Edward Kennedy, Elizabeth II, the British Queen, the Greek Royal Couple), and also other outstanding persons in the field of science, literature, film and sports (American astronaut Neil Armstrong, opera star Mario del Monaco, chess magician Robert Fischer, film stars Laurence Olivier, Gérard Philipe, Yves Montand, Elizabeth Taylor, Orson Welles, Yul Brynner, as well as a lot of artists and legends in the country, musicians, actors and writers – Nobel Laureate Ivo Andrić, Branko Ćopić, Desanka Maksimović, Dobrica Ćosić, Vasko Popa – make a special half a century long chronology of life and events in, at some time, large and shared country. These meetings sometimes turned for Kragujević into lifelong friendships ( academician dr. Seli, writers and translators Stojan Vujičić, Zoltan Čuka, painters Božidar Jakac, Lazar Vujaklija, Ilija Vilotić, Libero Markoni, Ištvan Tot, Andruško Karolj, woman sculptors Vida Jocić, Mira Sandić, art historian Oto Bihali Merin, and others), and the contacts with numerous artists, who wanted the portraits taken by him as an author (conductor Djura Jakšić, composer and guitar player Jovan Jovičić, violinist Branko Pajović, journalist Leon Davičo (thanks to whom Stevan came to "Politika"), and poets Dušan Radović and Oskar Davičo, all of whom created unrepeatable story about mutual support, cooperation and understanding.

Exhibitions 
He took part at numerous international and Yugoslav exhibitions, and was also the author of special one- man shows, most often dedicated to his home town Senta. His first solo exhibition – One hundred photographs by Stevan Kragujević was held in his native town Senta from April 28 to May 5, 1956. The last exhibition, in the Museum of the Town of Senta in March 2000, next to 65- year jubilee of dealing with photography – symbolically represented Stevan's whole work.

Appreciations 
A lot of people wrote about Stevan Kragujević: academician Prof. Istvan Szeli, master of photography and photoanthologist Borivoj Mirosavljević, art photography historian prof. dr. Milanka Todić and Goran Malić, art historian Atila Pejin, writers Živojin Pavlović, Jovica Aćin, Draginja Ramadanski and Vasa Pavković, publicists Momčilo Stefanović, Dušan Djurić, Budimir Potočan, prominent journalists, contemporaries and colleagues: Borko Gvozdenović Milinko Stefanović, Djordje Bukilica, Stevan Labudović, Dragan Mitrović, Predrag Milosavljević, Ana Lazukić, Ištvan Nemet, Milorad Mitrović and others.

One of the most important books on the life and work of Stevan Kragujević was published posthumously, and marked an anniversary of the departure of this outstanding photojournalist and art photographer. The photo monograph entitled Prostor večnosti (The Space of Eternity), the photo monograph about the life and work of Stevan Kragujević was edited by Borivoj Mirosavljević and was published in the series “Zlatno oko” (“The Golden Eye”) by Foto i  kino savez Vojvodine, Novi Sad, 2003 (Photo and Cinema Association of Vojvodina), and supported by the City Assembly of Senta. The book was promoted in April 2003 in Senta, Belgrade and Novi Sad, and followed by the exhibitions representing the most important photos and the moments in the life and work of Stevan Kragujević.

Authorial works

Books with the works of Stevan Kragujević 
 Turnir nacija, IX šahovska olimpijada, Dubrovnik, 1950. Izdanje Šahovskog saveza Jugoslavije, 1950.
 Tanja Kragujević: Vratio se Volođa. Edicija "Prva knjiga", Matica srpska, Novi Sad, 1966. Sa fotosima Stevana Kragujevića.
 Momčilo Stevanović: Titov putokaz. Fotografije: Stevan Kragujević. Dečje novine, Gornji Milanovac, 1977.
 Momčilo Stefanović, Stevan Kragujević: Ljubav bez granica. Tito i pioniri. Izdavač: NIRO “Mladost”, Beograd. Suizdavač: Savet Saveza pionira Jugoslavije. Oprema: Nenad Čonkić. Beograd, 1980.
 Mirko Arsić, Dragan R. Marković: 68.Studentski bunt i društvo. Fotografije: Stevan Kragujević'. Novinska organizacija “Prosvetni pregled”, Beograd, Istraživačko-izdavački centar SSO Srbije. Urednici: Milivoje Pavlović, Velimir Ćurguz Kazimir. Recenzenti: Dušan Janjić, Karel Turza. Grafička i likovna oprema: Brano Gavrić. Fotografije Stevan Kragujević. Beograd, 1984.
 Kragujević. Senta koje više nema. Sa stihovima Tanje Kragujević iz zbirke "Pejzaži nevidljivog". Povodom 300-te godišnjice bitke kod Sente. Kulturno-obrazovni centar "Turzo Lajoš" i štamparija "Udarnik", Senta, 1997.

Important publications with the author’s works 
 SKOPJE, 1963. Urednik: Jovan Popovski. Crtež na ovitku izradio Vasilije Popović-Cico. Fotografije: Kiro Georgievski, Blagoja Drnkov, Kiro Bilbilovski, Cvetko Ivanovski, Slave Kaspinov, Edo Meršinjak, Kočo Nedkov, Foto “Nova Makedonija”, Nikola Bibić, Jovan Ritopečki, Gogo Popov, Aleksandar Minčev, Steva Kragujević, Drago Rendulić Izdavač: Agencija za fotodokumentaciju, Zagreb, 1963.
 YUGOSLAV FEDERAL ASSEMBLY. Belgrade, 1965. Board of Editors: Živan Mitrović, Branko Kostić, Dragoljub Đurović. Editor: Dragoljub Đurović. Photographs by: Miodrag Đorđević, Stevan Kragujević. Lay-out by: Ante Šantić. Translated by: DR Marko Pavičić. Published by: “Mladost”, Beograde, Maršala Tita 2. Štampa: Grafičko preduzuće “Slobodan Jović”, Beograd.
 SKUPŠTINA SFRJ, Beograd, 1978. Izdaje: Sekretarijat za informacije Skupštine SFRJ. Pripremili i uredili Aleksandar Petković, Dragoljub Đurović. Sarađivali: Branko Kostić. Željko Škalamera (na tekstu o zgradi Skupštine SFRJ). Fotografije: Miodrag Đorđević, Ivo Eterović, Stevan Kragujević, Tomislav Peternek, Žorž Skrigin, Tanjug. Tehniči urednik Sveta Mandić. Izdavač: “Turistička štampa “, Beograd. Štampa: Beogradski izdavačko-grafički zavod, Beograd.
 TITO U PRIRODI I LOVU. Izdavač: Izdavačko instruktivni biro, Zagreb. Monogorafiju pripremilo Beogradsko lovačko društvo, Beograd.1980.
 TITO. ILUSTROVANA BIOGRAFIJA. Uvod: Pavle Savić. Tekst: Rajko Bobot. Recenzent: Jovo Kapičić. Umetnički urednik Miodrag Vartebedijan. Fotografije:Branibor Debeljković, Ivo Eterović, Džon Filips, Historijski arhiv Bjelovar, Radovan Ivanović, Duško Jovanović, Stevan Kragujević, Mirko Lovrić, Dimitrije Manolev, Muzej grada Beograda, Muzej revolucije naroda i narodnosti Jugoslavije, Milan Pavić, Miloš Rašeta, Žorž Skrigin, Aleksandar Stojanović, Filmoteka Osjek, Foto Tanjug, Žirovrad Vučić. Izdavaći: Jugoslovenska revija. Beograd, Vuk Karadžić, Beograd. Štampa: Mladinska knjiga, Ljubljana, 1980, 1981.
 TITO U KRUŠEVCU. Bagdala, Kruševac, 1981.
 Đorđe Kablar: Crvena kolonija. Povodom 40. godišnjice pobede nad fašizmom. Senta. Deo fotografija snimio Stevan Kragujević. 1985.
 PISAC U FOTOGRAFIJI. IVO ANDRIĆ 1892–1975. Povodom izložbe Muzeja grada Beograda i Salona fotografije. Izdavač: Muzej grada Beograda, posebna izdanja, 1985.
 Radovan Popović: Ivo Andrić, Život. Autori fotografija: Piotr Barqcz, Foto Tanjug, Mladen Grčević, RTV Beograd, Vojni muzej JNA, Arhiv grada Beograda, Đorđe Popović, Dimitar Manolev, Stevan Kragujević, Rade Milojković, A. Aškania, Nikola Bibić, Budim Budimovski, Vojislav Beloica, Arhiv Josipa Broza Tita, Gvozden Jovanić, i drugi, neoznačeni autori.Zadružbina Ive Andrića, Beograd, 1988.
 Živojin Pavlović: Ispljuvak pun krvi. Biblioteka Zabrane! Kolo 1, knjiga 1. Urednik Miroslav Dereta, Dijana Dereta. Grafički atelje Dereta. Likovno grafička oprema: Živojin Pavlović, Miroslav Dereta, Neboša Rogić. Fotografija – korice, Stevan Kragujević. Beograd, 1990.Fotografije u knjizi: Stevan Kragujević, T. Peternek, D. Konstantinović, S. Sulejmanović, Ž. Pavlović, P. Otoranov
 Dragan Vlahović, Nataša Marković : Jovanka Broz – Život na dvoru. Fotografije Dragutin Grbić i Stevan Kragujević. Biblioteka “Misterije politike”. Akvarius, Novi Beograd, 1990.
 Tija voda. Edicija "Istorija poljoprivrede, salaša i sela", XI knjiga. Glavni urednik prof. dr Veselin Lazić. Izdavač: Kulutrno-istorijsko društvo "Proleće na čenejskim salašima", PČESA, Novi Sad, 1995.
 Komšija pa Bog. Edicija "Istorija poljoprivrede, salaša i sela", XII knjiga. PČESA, Novi Sad, 1996. Glavni urednik Prof. dr Veselin Lazić. Urednici: Prof. dr Miloš Marjanović, Milan Grujić, književnik. Izdavač: Kulutrno istorijsko društvo “Proleće na čenejskim salašima”. Štampa: Mala knjiga, Novi Sad, Bulevar Vojvode Stepe 137. Novi Sad, oktobar 1996.
 Pavlović, Živojin: Ispljuvak pun krvi, Dnevnik ' 68. Dnevnici, knjiga treća. Prometej, Novi Sad, Kwit podium, Beograd, 1999.
 Petar Terzić: Sremac. Izdavač: Kulturno-obrazovni centar "Turzo Lajoš", Senta, 2002.
 Petar Terzić: Srpska čitaonica u Senti 1868–1957. Izdavač : PP Rapido, Senta, i Kulutrno-obrazovni centar "Turzo Lajoš", Senta, 2002.
 Borivoj Mirosavljević : Vojvodina. Predeli i ljudi. Dnevnik, novine i časopisi. Novi Sad, 2005.
 Narodna biblioteka Srbje. Vodič. Izdanje Narodne biblioteke Srbije, 1973. (Izuzev fotosa iz istorijata Biblioteke I reprinta starih rukopisa, sve fotose novog zdanja Narodne biblioteke, svečano otvorene za javnost 6. aprila 1973. godine, načinio je Stevan Kragujević)

Anthologies, collections, lexicons 
 Dragoljub Milivojević: “Politika” – svedok našeg doba 1904–1984. Narodna knjiga, Prosveta, Beograd. 1984.
 DVA VEKA SRPSKOG NOVINARSTVA. Institut za novinarstvo, Beograd, 1992.
 Borivoj Mirosavljević: Antologija fotografije Vojvodine, knjiga 1. Foto, kino i video savez Vojvodine, Novi Sad, 2000.
 Borivoj Mirosavljević: Antologija fotografije Vojvodine, knjiga 2, Foto, kino i video savez Vojvodine, Novi Sad, 2001.
 Borivoj Mirosavljević: Antologija fotografije Vojvodine, knjiga 3, Foto, kino i video savez Vojvodine, Novi Sad, 2002.
 Borivoj Mirosavljević: Antologija fotografije Vojovidne, knjiga 4, Foto, kino i video savez Vojvodine, Novi Sad, 2003.
 TANJUG, FOTO. 60 GODINA POSTOJANJA. Priredio Živorad Vućić. JP Novinska agenicija Tanjug. Beograd, 2003.
 STO FOTOREPORTERA POLITIKE. Vek Politike, 1904 – 2004. Publikacija povodom izložbe u Holu “Politike”, Beograd, 2004.
 Dušan Đurić: NOVINARSKI LEKSIKON, YU Marketing pres, Kompanija Novosti, Beograd, 2003.
 Borivoj Mirosavljević: Antologija fotografije Vojvodine, knjiga 5, Foto, kino i video savez Vojvodine, Novi Sad, 2004.
 Borivoj Mirosavljević: Antologija fotografije Vojvodine, knjiga 6, Foto, kino i video savez Vojvodine, Novi Sad, 2005.
 Goran Malić: Letopis srpske fotografije, 1939–2008. Fotogram, Beograd, 2009.
 Miško Šuvaković: ISTORIJA UMETNOSTI U SRBIJI, XX VEK. Drugi tom. Realizmi i modernizmi oko hladnog rata. O fotografiji: Jelena Matić/Fotografija socijalističkog realizma. Orion art, Beograd, 2012.
 ČUVARI USPOMENA I SVEDOCI ISTORIJE. FOTOREPORTERI VOJVODINE. GUARDIANS OF MEMORIES AND WITNESSES OF HISTORY. PHOTOJOURNALISTS OF VOJVODINA. Priredio Darko Dozet. Predgovor: Misija hrabrosti i podvig neponovljivosti, dr Draško Ređep; Slikom do istine, Borivoj Mirosavljević, majstor fotografije. Prevodi: Snežana Kovačić. Izdavač: Foto asocijacija Vojvodine. Dizajn i štampa Graphit plus doo. Novi Sad, 2014.

Stevan Kragujević’s legacy 
Owing to the efforts and willingness of Tanja Kragujević, Stevan’s daughter, a remarkably valuable piece of Stevan Kragujević's heritage was established in the Museum of Yugoslav History on April 1, 2015. The legacy holds nearly 6.000 original negatives and about 1.500 photographs, many books and catalogues about Stevan Kragujević and those with his photos, as well as dozens of items and documents giving evidence of his profession as a photojournalist, and also about his cooperation and friendship with many outstanding contemporaries home and abroad.

Among the photos, making this way the photo archives of the Museum of Yugoslav History more valuable, are those telling about the activities of President Josip Broz Tito in the country, numerous portraits of other politicians who marked the second half of the twentieth century, and also the photos of the Students Protests of 1968 and political events in the last decade of the life of Yugoslavia.

Awards and acknowledgements 

 Stevan Kragujević is a recipient of numerous awards for his journalist and art photography. Among others are the following:
 Silver Medal of the town of Senta, October 1967.
 Silver Medal of the town of Senta, October 1978.
 Gold Medal of Senta, October 8, 1982.
 “Politika” Award – golden watch, January 25, 1973
 Belgrade City Memorial Plaque and Diploma (thirty years of freedom, in recognition of work and dedication in the development of Belgrade, 1944–1974.
 Plaque for 25-year work in journalism in the Journalist Association of Yugoslavia
 Plaque for 25-year continuous work in “Politika”, January 25, 1978.
 Gold Medal on the occasion of the “Politika” jubilee, January 25, 1978.
 Gold Medal on the occasion of the „Politika“ jubilee, 1944–1984.
 Befu '85, 7th World Biennal of Photography, Belgrade, October 19 – November 2, 1985.
 Gold Badge of “Politika” on the occasion of 80 years of “Politika” photo department, February 1, 1987.

Special acknowledgements:
 Gold watch given by Josip Broz Tito, December 27, 1979.
 Senta Town Award, Pro Urbe, September 9, 2001.
 “Svetozar Marković” Life –Acievement Award of the Journalist Association of Serbia, June 13, 1996, “for hundred thousands of photos of historical value and for dedicated life to the profession”.

References

External links 
 Official
 Spomen-izlozba
 Draginja Ramadanski /Pesnici tihosti
 Politika/Zaostavština koja se meri kilometrima

1922 births
2002 deaths
People from Senta
Serbian photographers
Yugoslav people